Hypolycaena narada, the Banded Tit, is a butterfly in the family Lycaenidae. It is found in Arunachal Pradesh, India.

Range
The species is known only from Arunachal Pradesh, India, so far, but may occur in the adjoining north-eastern states of India and in Myanmar.

Status
Locally common.

Description
Distinguished from other related species based on the following characters: 
 Slightly shining purple-blue upper forewing with a dark, diffused androconial patch
 Underside forewing apex and margin concolorous with the wing
 Underside wings with narrow discal bands, ending in black costal spots
 Coastal black spot near the base

Habits
It is common along cool streams and frequently encountered puddling on wet soil.

See also
List of butterflies of India
List of butterflies of India (Lycaenidae)

References

Butterflies described in 2015
Hypolycaenini
Butterflies of Asia